Dasyarctia is a monotypic genus of tiger moths in the family Erebidae. The genus includes only one species, Dasyarctia grisea, which is found in South Africa and Tanzania.

References

External links
Natural History Museum Lepidoptera generic names catalog

Spilosomina
Dasyarctia grisea
Monotypic moth genera
Moths of Africa